Beitstad is a village in the municipality of Steinkjer in Trøndelag county, Norway. The village was the administrative centre of the old municipality of Beitstad which existed from 1838 until 1964 when it was merged into Steinkjer.

Beitstad is situated along Norwegian County Road 17 (Fylkesvei 17) which has twisted through the village since 1867.  It is a typical farming village that stretches from the bay and into the hinterland to the east. Animal husbandry, crop production, and forestry have traditionally been the prime industries. Beitstad Church is located in this village.

Notable residents
Three citizens from Beitstad were among the founding fathers of the Norwegian Constitution:
 Sivert Bratberg (1780 at Bratberg øvre – 1816) a Norwegian farmer and teacher
 Hans Midelfart (1772–1823) Lutheran minister in Beitstad 
 Daniel Larsen Schevig (1786 at Gladsjø farm –1833) farmer and military officer

Other notable residents 
 Theodora Cormontan (1840 in Beitstad – 1922) a Norwegian-American pianist, music publisher and composer
 Oluf A. Saugestad (1840 in Beitstad - 1926) a member of the Wisconsin State Assembly 
 Hans Konrad Foosnæs (1846–1917) politician, Mayor of Beitstad and government Minister
 Halvor Bachke Guldahl (1859 in Beitstad – 1931) jurist, businessman, and County Governor of Nord-Trøndelag
 Kristofer Uppdal (1878 in Beitstad – 1961) poet and author
 Olav Benum (1897 in Beitstad – 1990) politician and agronomist 
 Erling Østerberg (1901 in Beitstad – 1981) distinguished Norwegian police officer
 Inge Einarsen Bartnes (1911 in Beitstad – 1988) politician, twice deputy Mayor
 Stål Aanderaa (born 1931 in Beitstad) a Norwegian mathematician
 Erik Bartnes (born 1939 in Beitstad) a Norwegian farmer and politician

References

Villages in Trøndelag
Steinkjer